Fargo usually refers to:
 Fargo, North Dakota, United States
 Fargo (1996 film), a crime film by the Coen brothers
 Fargo (TV series), an American black comedy–crime drama anthology television series

Fargo may also refer to:

Other places

United States
 Fargo, Arkansas
 Fargo, Georgia
 Fargo, Indiana
 Fargo, Benton County, Indiana
 Fargo, Ohio
 Fargo, Oklahoma
 Fargo, Wisconsin

Arts, entertainment, and media
 Fargo (1952 film), an American western film directed by Lewis D. Collins
 Fargo, a character from the anime series Bubblegum Crisis
 Fargo, a character from the video game Chrono Cross
 Douglas Fargo, a character from the TV-series "Eureka"
 "Fargo", a track by Caravan Palace on the 2019 album Chronologic

Military
 Fargo-class cruiser, a ship design of the United States Navy
 , the first Fargo-class cruiser
 Mikoyan-Gurevich MiG-9 (NATO reporting name: "Fargo"), a Soviet fighter plane
 USS Fargo (CL-85), original name for the  aircraft carrier
 Fargo, the ammunition compound next to the Royal School of Artillery

Vehicles
 Fargo Trucks, originally manufactured by the Chrysler Corporation, later by Askam
 Isuzu Fargo, a commercial vehicle

Other uses
 FARGO (programming language)
 Fargo (surname)

See also
 Fargodome, an indoor athletic stadium located in Fargo, North Dakota
 Fargo–Moorhead, the metropolitan area comprising Fargo, North Dakota, Moorhead, Minnesota, and the surrounding communities
 Fargo-Moorhead RedHawks, a baseball team
 Fargo-Moorhead Beez, a former basketball team
 Fargo-Moorhead Fever, a former basketball team
 Wells Fargo, a financial services company